Michael Omartian, American musician, keyboardist, and music producer has released 4 solo studio albums, 9 collaboration albums, 4 promotional singles, 2 EPs, and 1 compilation albums. He has sold over 350 million albums over the span of his career whether it be through being a solo artist, producer, or anything of the like.

He launched his musical career in the 1970s with the disco band Rhythm Heritage. The group went on to be known for their #1 single, "Theme from S.W.A.T." which peaked at number 1 on the US Hot 100. While with the band, he released multiple solo albums and with others, like White Horse and Adam Again

After the disbandment of Rhythm Heritage in 1979 after ruling the 1970s, he focused more on producing in the Christian field of music as a session musician. Thanks in part to incredibly successful albums like Amy Grant's Heart in Motion, which sold over 5 million copies, he became widely known in the music industry as a producer and gradually stopped focusing on his solo work.

Discography

Solo 
1974: White Horse (Myrrh Records)
1977: Adam Again (Myrrh)
1986: Conversations (instrumental) (Reunion)
1991: The Race (Word/Epic)

Michael and Stormie Omartian 
1978: Seasons of the Soul (Myrrh)
1980: The Builder (Seymour)
1982: Mainstream (Sparrow)
1982: Omartian Odyssey: The Musical Journey of Michael and Stormie Omartian (compilation) (Myrrh)
1983: Together Live (with 2nd Chapter of Acts) (Sparrow)

Others 
1974: Compliments of Garcia Jerry Garcia (Round)
1976: Through a Child's Eyes Annie Herring (Sparrow)
1995: Like Brothers Pratt & McClain (Sonrise Music)
1995: Contemporary Mozart (non-US release entitled Bon Appetit: Contemporary Mozart Arrangements Volume 2) (K-Tel)
2000: Child of the Promise: A Musical Story Celebrating The Birth of Christ Michael and Stormie Omartian (Sparrow)

Producer 
1972: I've Found Someone of My Own The Free Movement
1974: White Horse Michael Omartian
1975: Young Frankenstein (original soundtrack)
1976: I'd Rather Believe in You Cher
1976: I've Got a Reason The Richie Furay Band
1976: Streetheart Dion DiMucci
1977: Love at First Sight Dionne Warwick
1977: Crackin''' Crackin'
1978: Special Touch Crackin'
1978: Sweet Salvation Jim Krueger (musician)
1979: Christopher Cross Christopher Cross
1979: One More Song for You The Imperials
1979: Radio Dream by Roger Voudouris
1980: Priority The Imperials
1981: Maxus Maxus
1981: Nobody Knows Me Like You Benny Hester
1981: Still Feels Good Tom Johnston
1983: Another Page Christopher Cross
1983: She Works Hard for the Money Donna Summer
1984: Camouflage Rod Stewart
1984: Cats Without Claws Donna Summer
1985: Choose Life Debby Boone
1985: Every Turn of the World Christopher Cross
1986: About Last Night... (original soundtrack)
1986: Conversations Michael Omartian
1986: The Karate Kid, Pt. 2 (original soundtrack)
1986: Solitude/Solitaire Peter Cetera
1987: Friends for Life Debby Boone
1988: Back of My Mind Christopher Cross
1989: Bowling in Paris Stephen Bishop
1990: Downtown Train Rod Stewart
1991: For Our Children Disney
1991: Heart in Motion Amy Grant
1991: The Race Michael Omartian
1992: Countess Countess Vaughn
1992: Sarafina! The Sound of Freedom (original soundtrack)
1993: The Standard Carman
1993: Taking Heaven by Storm Steve Camp
1994: Christmas Spirit Donna Summer
1994: House of Love Amy Grant
1994: Kathy Troccoli Kathy Troccoli
1994: The Light Inside Gary Chapman
1994: Maverick (original soundtrack)
1994: Mercy in the Wilderness Steve Camp
1994: La Razon de Cantar First Call
1994: The Ride 4Him
1994: Sizzlin' Sounds Collection various artists
1994: Slow Revival Bryan Duncan
1995: Field of Souls Wayne Watson
1995: Helen Darling Helen Darling
1996: The Birdcage (original soundtrack)
1996: Come on Back Billy and Sarah Gaines
1996: Distant Call Susan Ashton
1996: The Message 4Him
1996: Mission Accomplished: Themes for Spies various artists
1996: Fade Into Light Boz Scaggs
1996: Shelter Gary Chapman
1996: Summer of '78 Barry Manilow
1997: Amazing Grace, Vol. 2: A Country Salute to Gospel various artists
1997: Let Us Pray: National Day of Prayer various artists
1997: The Way in a Manger: Country Christmas various artists
1998: Movies Greatest Love Songs various artists
1998: Obvious 4Him
1998: Breath of Heaven: A Christmas Collection Vince Gill
1998: The Way Home Wayne Watson
1999: A Christmas to Remember Amy Grant
1999: In the Moon of Wintertime: Christmas with Michael Crawford1999: Learning to Breathe Larry Stewart
1999: Love Takes Time Bryan Duncan
1999: Touched by an Angel: The Christmas Album [original television soundtrack]
2000: Brand New Dream Danny Gans
2000: Hymns: A Place of Worship 4Him
2000: Organ-Ized: All-Star Tribute to the Hammond B3 Organ various artists
2001: Angel Eyes (original soundtrack)
2001: Another Perfect World Peter Cetera
2003: Pass the Love Larnelle Harris
2003: Cliff at Christmas Cliff Richard
2003: 24 Point of Grace
2003: Visible 4Him
2004: ‘70s: From Acoustic to the Wall of Sound Dion DiMucci
2004: Prayer That Changes Everything Stormie Omartian
2005: Christmas Reunion Tony Orlando & Dawn
2005: Something's Goin' On Cliff Richard
2006: Encore...For Future Generations 4Him
2006: Collections Kenny Loggins
2009: Where's Our Revolution Matt Brouwer
2009: Beloved Lara Landon
2010: Bold As Brass Cliff Richard

 Video 
1983: Together Live [with 2nd Chapter of Acts]
1985: We Are the World (Synthesizer arranger, keyboardist)
1994: Amy Grant: Building the House of Love (musician)
1994: Maverick'' (performer: "Amazing Grace")

References 

Discographies of American artists
Pop music discographies
Rock music discographies